The equestrian events at the 2022 Mediterranean Games was held on 1 and 3 July 2022 at the Antar Ibn Chaddad Equestrian Center in Es Sénia.

Medal summary

Medal table

References

External links
2022 Mediterranean Games – Equestrian
Results book

Sports at the 2022 Mediterranean Games
2022
Mediterranean Games